Avery Dennison Corporation is a multinational manufacturer and distributor of pressure-sensitive adhesive materials (such as self-adhesive labels), apparel branding labels and tags, RFID inlays, and specialty medical products.  The company is a member of the Fortune 500 and is headquartered in Mentor, Ohio.

History

The company was founded in Los Angeles, California in 1935 as Kum Kleen Products, a partnership of Mr. and Mrs. Ray Stanton Avery. The name was changed to Avery Adhesives in 1937.  In 1946, the company was incorporated as Avery Adhesive Label Corp., and the name was subsequently changed to Avery Adhesive Products, Inc. in 1958, and to Avery Products Corporation in 1964.  The name was changed again to Avery International Corporation in 1976, and it became Avery Dennison after the company merged with the Dennison Manufacturing Company in 1990.

H. Russell Smith, a college friend of Avery's, joined the company in 1946 as a one-third owner and for nearly 40 years was Avery's partner in entrepreneurship, serving at various times as the company's president, chief executive officer and chairman of the board.  Smith incorporated the 50-person company in 1946, started its core label materials business, expanded operations across the U.S. and into Europe, and opened a renowned research center. As the company's representative to the financial community, he led its listing on the New York Stock Exchange in 1967. At Smith's death in 2014, CEO Dean Scarborough noted that “our company owes its existence and character in large part to Russ Smith's business acumen, personal integrity and generosity of spirit.  He was the perfect partner for Stan Avery.”

Dennison Manufacturing
The Dennison Manufacturing Company was founded by Andrew Dennison and his son Aaron Lufkin Dennison, residents of Brunswick. Maine, in 1844, as a jewelry- and watch-box manufacturing company located in the Dunlap Block of Maine Street.  Five years later Aaron turned the Dennison Manufacturing Company over to his younger brother, Eliphalet Whorf Dennison, who took over and developed the company into a significant-size industrial enterprise. It was in 1898 that the business moved to a location in Framingham, Massachusetts. Aaron Dennison went on to co-found the Waltham Watch Company in 1850, a leader in the American system of watch manufacturing using interchangeable parts.

Office and Consumer Products
Avery Dennison created a separate division for office products such as binders, file labels and name badges in 1982. The division and its products, sold under the Avery brand and logo, contrasted with the company's larger materials division in that its products were finished (“converted”) materials, and they were aimed at consumers as well as businesses. Over the next 30 years, the division grew, as personal computing created a market for printable media both at home and at work. However, with the rise of email and the decline in conventional mail, the office products market as a whole began to decline. On July 1, 2013, Avery Dennison completed the sale of Office and Consumer Products and a second business, Designed and Engineered Solutions, to CCL Industries. CCL purchased the Avery office products brand along with the business. Avery Dennison retains its full name, history, brand and logo.

Operations
The company is headquartered in Mentor, Ohio. It ranked number 435 on the 2015 Fortune 500 list with total sales of $7.0 billion. Its main lines of business are pressure-sensitive materials (contributing 73% of 2015 revenues) and retail branding and information solutions (contributing 26% of 2015 revenues). The company operates in more than 50 countries and employs 25,000 people worldwide. Its first overseas subsidiary was established in the Netherlands in 1955.

Divisions

The company's operations are organized into three business units:

The Pressure-Sensitive Materials segment manufactures and sells pressure-sensitive roll-label materials, films for graphic applications, reflective highway-safety products, a variety of specialized tapes, performance polymers, and extruded films.

Printers take its label materials, which are manufactured in large rolls, and convert them into finished labels by printing, cutting and applying them to packaging for consumer goods such as shampoo, beverages and pharmaceuticals.

The Retail Branding and Information Solutions segment designs, manufactures, and sells various branding and information management products and solutions for apparel and general retail, including tickets, graphic, barcode and radio-frequency identification (RFID) tags, labels and inserts, woven and printed labels, external embellishments, price management systems, a variety of fasteners, and related supplies and equipment.

The information management products that the business provides, including its RFID-based systems, help apparel and other retailers to manage inventory both within stores and across supply chains that today extend for thousands of miles. The ability to accurately identify inventory and replenish it can help improve the shopping experience, as goods are less likely to be out of stock.

In February 2022, it was announced Avery Dennison had acquired the Frick, Switzerland-based company, TexTrace, a technology developer specializing in custom-made woven and knitted RFID products that can be sewn onto or inserted into garments. In March 2022, Avery Dennison announced it had acquired the linerless label technology developed by the UK company, Catchpoint Ltd. The purchase covers Catchpoint's patents and brand.

The company also operates Avery Dennison Medical, which provides products such as wearable sensors, barrier films, wound dressings and a variety of tapes and securement products for the healthcare industry.  Results for Vancive Medical Technologies are reported in Other specialty converting businesses. Vancive Medical Technologies products are sold to medical products and device manufacturers.

Patent infringement

In 2012, Avery Dennison and 3M Company agreed to settle patent and antitrust litigation between the parties. The litigation began when 3M alleged that Avery Dennison infringed 3M's patents related to retroreflective sheeting used for road signs and other highway and transportation products and requested an injunction to prevent Avery Dennison from selling its OmniCube retroreflective product. The court denied 3M's request, and after Avery Dennison brought claims of its own against 3M for patent infringement and antitrust violations, the parties agreed to dismiss three pending cases.

References

External links
 

 Avery Dennison Announces Fourth Quarter and Full Year 2020 Results

American companies established in 1935
Companies listed on the New York Stock Exchange
1935 establishments in California
Companies based in Glendale, California
Manufacturing companies established in 1935
Manufacturing companies based in Greater Los Angeles
Office supply companies of the United States
Radio-frequency identification companies
Packaging companies of the United States
1960s initial public offerings